Franklin Peralta Bautista (born April 1, 1952) is a Filipino politician currently serving as the first Vice Governor of the newly created Province of Davao Occidental. A member of the Liberal Party, he has been elected to two terms as a Member of the House of Representatives of the Philippines, representing the Second District of Davao del Sur. He first served from 1998 to 2001, and was again elected in 2007. He also served two non-consecutive terms as Mayor of Malita when the municipality was then part of Davao del Sur.

References

.

20th-century Filipino lawyers
People from Davao del Sur
1952 births
Living people
Kabalikat ng Malayang Pilipino politicians
Members of the House of Representatives of the Philippines from Davao del Sur
Lakas–CMD politicians
Liberal Party (Philippines) politicians
People from Davao Occidental